Akane Nishino (born 4 February 2002) is a Japanese professional footballer who plays as a midfielder for WE League club MyNavi Sendai Ladies.

Club career 
Nishino made her WE League debut on 18 September 2021.

References

External links 
 
 

Living people
2002 births
Women's association football midfielders
WE League players
Japanese women's footballers
Association football people from Toyama Prefecture
Mynavi Vegalta Sendai Ladies players